John Harris Smithwick (July 17, 1872 – December 2, 1948) was a U.S. Representative from Florida.

Smithwick was born near Orange, Georgia and attended the public schools. He graduated from Reinhardt Normal College in Waleska, Georgia in 1895 and from Cumberland University's law school in Lebanon, Tennessee in 1897. Admitted to the bar in 1898, Smithwick entered private practice in Moultrie, Georgia. He moved to Pensacola, Florida in 1906.

Smithwick was elected as a Democrat to the 66th, 67th, and 68th Congresses, serving from March 4, 1919, to March 3, 1927. He was among those injured in the January 1922 Knickerbocker Theatre roof collapse. Smithwick was an unsuccessful candidate for renomination in 1926.

He engaged in the real estate business in Washington, D.C., and Fort Myers, Florida. He retired in 1932 and resided in Moultrie, Georgia, until his death in 1948. He was interred in Westview Cemetery.

References

External links 
 

1872 births
1948 deaths
People from Cherokee County, Georgia
Reinhardt University alumni
Cumberland School of Law alumni
Democratic Party members of the United States House of Representatives from Florida